Yim Sung-ah (born 20 March 1984) is a South Korean professional golfer.

Pre-LPGA Tour days
Yim was born in Seoul. She attended Yonsei University and turned professional in November 2002 while still a student. She was a member of the Korean team that won a gold medal at the 2002 Asian Games.

Yim played on the LPGA of Korea Tour in 2003. Like many other South Korean women golfers, she soon began to play primarily in the United States, joining the second tier Futures Tour in 2004.

LPGA Tour career and beyond
In 2005 Yim began playing on the LPGA Tour. In April 2006 she won the Florida's Natural Charity Championship. Paired with Annika Sörenstam for the final round, Yim kept pace with the #1 ranked woman golfer in the world. On the 71st hole with both golfers tied for the lead, Sorenstam hit her tee shot out of bounds resulting in a double bogey. Yim went on to win the tournament by two shots.

Yim only had limited LPGA Tour success after her one win. In 2010, she returned to South Korea to play the LPGA of Korea Tour.

LPGA Tour wins (1)

Results in LPGA majors

CUT = missed the half-way cut
"T" = tied

Team appearances
Amateur
Espirito Santo Trophy (representing South Korea): 2002

References

External links

Biography on seoulsisters.com

South Korean female golfers
LPGA of Korea Tour golfers
LPGA Tour golfers
Asian Games medalists in golf
Asian Games gold medalists for South Korea
Golfers at the 2002 Asian Games
Medalists at the 2002 Asian Games
Golfers from Seoul
Yonsei University alumni
1984 births
Living people